Mir Jafarlu (also Romanized as Mīr Ja‘farlū; also known as Mashhadī Ja‘far) is a village in Salavat Rural District, Moradlu District, Meshgin Shahr County, Ardabil Province, Iran. At the 2006 census, its population was 111, in 28 families.

References 

Towns and villages in Meshgin Shahr County